Zoran Batrović (Cyrillic: Зоран Батровић; born 4 February 1958) is a Yugoslav and Montenegrin retired footballer who played as a striker.

International career
Batrović made his debut for Yugoslavia in a September 1984 friendly match away against Scotland, it remained his only international appearance.

Personal life
His son, Veljko, is also a footballer.

Honours
Partizan
 Yugoslav Cup: 1988–89

References

External links
 
 
 

1958 births
Living people
Footballers from Podgorica
Association football forwards
Yugoslav footballers
Yugoslavia international footballers
FK Sutjeska Nikšić players
FK Jedinstvo Bijelo Polje players
FK Budućnost Podgorica players
FC Prishtina players
FK Partizan players
Deportivo de La Coruña players
FK Borac Banja Luka players
FK Mogren players
Yugoslav First League players
Yugoslav Second League players
Segunda División players
Yugoslav expatriate footballers
Expatriate footballers in Spain
Yugoslav expatriate sportspeople in Spain